A monophthong is a pure vowel sound, one whose articulation at both beginning and end is relatively fixed, and which does not glide up or down towards a new position of articulation.  The monophthongs can be contrasted with diphthongs, where the vowel quality changes within the same syllable, and hiatus, where two vowels are next to each other in different syllables. A vowel sound whose quality does not change over the duration of the vowel is called a pure vowel.

Sound changes

The conversions of monophthongs to diphthongs (diphthongization), and of diphthongs to monophthongs (monophthongization), are major elements of language change and are likely the cause of further changes.

In some languages, due to monophthongization, graphemes that originally represented diphthongs now represent monophthongs.

See also 
 Diphthong, also known as a vowel cluster
 Vowel hiatus
 Index of phonetics articles
 Table of vowels
 Semivowel
 Triphthong
 Vowel
 Vowel breaking

References

Vowels